Pińczów synagogue is a former Jewish synagogue in Pińczów in Poland.

It is one of the oldest synagogues in Poland, built between 1594 and 1609. It was damaged during the Holocaust, which led to its disuse. Restoration on the building began in the 1970s, led by the Pińczów Regional Museum, with most of the repairs completed by 1998.

References

Former synagogues in Poland
16th-century synagogues
Pińczów County
Buildings and structures in Świętokrzyskie Voivodeship
Holocaust locations in Poland